Menouthis was a sacred city in ancient Egypt, devoted to the Egyptian goddess Isis and god Serapis. The city was probably submerged under the sea as a result of catastrophic natural causes:  earthquakes or Nile flood. Land in the bay area was subject to rising sea levels, earthquakes, and tsunamis, parts of it apparently becoming submerged after a process of soil liquefaction sometime at the end of the 2nd century BC.

Name 
The city's name most probably comes from Isis's epithet mwt-nTr, "Mother of God" (Horus).

Religious significance
In Roman Egypt, Menouthis was widely known as an oracular and healing cult centre of the Ancient Egyptian goddess Isis and it drew devotees from a wide region. The temple of Isis in the city contained religious statues and was decorated with hieroglyphs. In 391 AD the city's Serapeum was demolished during the persecution of pagans in the late Roman Empire, and in the following year the temple of Isis was closed and partially dismantled, with Christian Tabennesiote monks taking over the temple's country estates. In 413 AD, at a site opposite the temple, Pope Theophilus of Alexandria built a Christian shrine dedicated to the Four Evangelists. The shrine became home to the bones of the saints Cyrus and John, which were moved there from Alexandria by Cyril of Alexandria.

During the 5th century the Isis temple continued to be used for clandestine sacrifices and incubation rites. Coptic tradition says that the temple remained in use alongside the Christian shrine and the worship of Egyptian gods and their statues continued in the city. However, as time went by the traditional healing function of the temple was transferred to the Christian shrine. The temple was demolished in 484 AD and the statues of the classical gods in the city were removed or destroyed in 488–89 AD. By the end of the 5th century the Christian shrine had replaced the temple as a healing centre. At the height of its popularity in the 6th and 7th centuries the shrine was one of the two principal pilgrimage centres of Christian Egypt.

In popular culture
"Menouthis" is also the name of a song by E. S. Posthumus, inspired by the ancient city.

See also
 List of ancient Egyptian towns and cities

References

Further reading

Cities in ancient Egypt
Submerged places
Persecution of pagans in the late Roman Empire